{{DISPLAYTITLE:C7H11NO4}}
The molecular formula C7H11NO4 (molar mass: 173.17 g/mol, exact mass: 173.0688 u) may refer to:

 ACPD, or 1-Amino-1,3-dicarboxycyclopentane
 Aminoshikimic acid
 Oxaceprol

Molecular formulas